Abolfazl Anvari (9 February 1938 – 14 February 2018) was an Iranian heavyweight freestyle wrestler. He won bronze medals at the 1966 and 1969 World Championships and at the 1970 Asian Games. He placed fourth at the 1967 World Championships and sixth at the 1968 Summer Olympics.

References

1938 births
2018 deaths
Wrestlers at the 1968 Summer Olympics
Wrestlers at the 1972 Summer Olympics
Olympic wrestlers of Iran
Iranian male sport wrestlers
Wrestlers at the 1970 Asian Games
Medalists at the 1970 Asian Games
Asian Games bronze medalists for Iran
Asian Games medalists in wrestling
People from Saveh
World Wrestling Championships medalists
20th-century Iranian people
21st-century Iranian people